The Unrepresented Nations and Peoples Organization, or simply UNPO is an international organization established to facilitate the voices of unrepresented and marginalised nations and peoples worldwide. It was formed on 11 February 1991 in The Hague, Netherlands. Its members consist of indigenous peoples, minorities, and unrecognised or occupied territories. 

UNPO works to develop the understanding of and respect for the right to self-determination, provides advice and support related to questions of international recognition and political autonomy, trains groups on how to advocate for their causes effectively, and directly advocates for an international response to human rights violations perpetrated against UNPO member groups. Some former members, such as Armenia, East Timor, Estonia, Latvia, Georgia and Palau, have gained full independence and joined the United Nations (UN).

History 
The founders were representatives of national movements of Estonia, Latvia, Tibet, Crimean Tatars, Armenia, Georgia, Tatarstan, East Turkestan, East Timor, Australian Aboriginals, the Cordillera in the Philippines, the Greek minority in Albania, Kurdistan, Palau, Taiwan, and West Papua. A key UNPO goal was, and remains, to replicate the success of the 14th Dalai Lama's and the Tibetan people's non-violent message in the face of oppression and occupation.

UNPO chose for its founding headquarters in 1991 The Hague in the Netherlands because the city aimed at becoming the International City of Peace and Justice and hosts international courts like the International Court of Justice (ICJ) and International Criminal Court (ICC). A Foundation was established in the Netherlands to provide secretarial support to the UNPO General Assembly and to carry out research and educational activities related to unrepresented peoples worldwide. The Foundation maintains a permanent presence before the European Union, United States and United Nations. It is funded by a combination of member contributions, donations from individuals and project-based grants from foundations.

Aims 
UNPO's vision is to affirm democracy as a fundamental human right, implement human, civil and political rights worldwide, uphold the universal right to autonomy and self-determination, and further federalism. It encourages nonviolent methodologies to reach peaceful solutions to conflicts and oppression. UNPO supports members in getting their human and cultural rights respected and in preserving their environments. The organization provides a forum for members to network and assists them in participating at an international level.

Although UNPO members often have different goals, they have one thing in common: they are generally not represented diplomatically (or only with a minor status, such as observer) in major international institutions, such as the United Nations (UN). As a result, their ability to have their concerns addressed by the global bodies mandated to protect human rights and address conflict is limited.

UNPO is dedicated to the five principles enshrined in its Covenant:

 The equal right to self-determination;
 Adherence to the internationally accepted human rights standards as laid down in the Vienna Declaration and Programme of Action and other international instruments;
 Adherence to the principles of democratic pluralism and rejection of totalitarianism and religious intolerance;
 Promotion of non-violence and the rejection of terrorism as an instrument of policy; and
 Protection of the natural environment.

All members are required to sign and abide by the UNPO Covenant. UNPO members are required to be nonviolent.

Members 
The following are listed as members by the UNPO.

Original members are listed with pink background and in bold.

Suspensions 
UNPO's representing nations may become suspended from the Organization if they fail to follow its covenant.

In 24 January 1993,  was briefly admitted in the Unrepresented Nations and Peoples Organization, but was suspended in a few months. The membership suspension was made permanent on 22 January 1995.

 was also suspended on 18 September 2011.

Former members 
Some members of the UNPO have left because of United Nations (UN) recognition, autonomy agreements, or for other reasons.

The following lists former and suspended members.

Former members who became part of the UN are highlighted with a blue background and italics. Original members (from 11 February 1991) are listed with pink background and in bold.

Leadership 
Secretaries general

Executive Director
 Karl Habsburg-Lothringen – (Austria) 19 January 2002 – 31 December 2002

Chair/Presidents of the General Assembly
 Linnart Mäll – (Estonia) 1991–1993
 Erkin Alptekin – (Uyghurs) 1993–1997
 Seif Sharif Hamad – (Zanzibar) 1997–2001
 John J. Nimrod – (Assyrians) 2001–2005
 Göran Hansson – (Scania) 2005–2006
 Ledum Mitee – (Ogoni) 2006–2010
 Ngawang Choephel Drakmargyapon – (Tibet) 2010–2015
 Nasser Boladai – (West Balochistan) 2015-2022
 Edna Adan Ismail - (Somaliland) since 2022

See also 
 Federal Union of European Nationalities
 Micronation
 League for Small and Subject Nationalities
 United Nations list of non-self-governing territories
 Universal Declaration of the Rights of Peoples
 List of active separatist movements recognized by intergovernmental organizations
 European Free Alliance
 Stateless nation

References

External links 
 

 
International nongovernmental organizations
Human rights organisations based in the Netherlands
Organisations based in The Hague
Organizations established in 1991
1991 establishments in Belgium
Recipients of the European Citizen's Prize